TV-aksjonen (English: "The TV Campaign/Auction") is an annual national Norwegian charity fund raising event that since 1974 has been run by Norwegian public broadcaster NRK in conjunction with selected organizations. The fundraiser is the world's largest, measured in terms of donated value per capita and number of participants. The event is central to Norwegian society inasmuch as it is viewed as the most famous and trusted charity fundraiser in the country. The campaign is held on a Sunday in October each year, and on the selected day NRK devotes most of its airtime to informing the public about the organization and that year's special cause.

The beneficiary of each year's event is decided by a fund-raising committee at NRK, which also receives detailed follow-up reports from the selected charity on the spending of the raised money. Charities vary, with causes including combating poverty, providing healthcare, clearing minefields and munitions, protecting women, and the environment. The Norwegian Refugee Council and Norwegian Church Aid are the organizations which have the most campaigns run for their benefit, with five and four fundraisers, respectively. Funds have also been earmarked to assist displaced persons in Armenia, Azerbaijan, Burundi, Angola, and Uganda (1998), and refugees from wars in Afghanistan, Pakistan, Democratic Republic of the Congo, Sudan, Somalia, the Palestinian territories, and Colombia (2010).

Contributions are collected in a number of ways. Central to the campaign is the door-to-door campaign of approximately 100,000 volunteers servicing all 1.8million Norwegian households, as well as donations accepted via telephone or by funds transfer to the campaign's bank account. NRK also hosts a live auction of various items and experiences, with proceeds also going to that year's selected charity. Several organizations donate considerable amounts, as does the government of Norway on behalf of the Norwegian people.

Since its inception, a total of about 9billion NOK ($1.1billion USD) has been raised as of 2017.

List of campaigns

Awards and nominations

Notes

External links
 TV-aksjonen official webpage

References

Charity events